Galaxy Orbiter is a steel spinning roller coaster at the Galaxyland amusement park in West Edmonton Mall, Edmonton, Alberta, Canada. It was built by German manufacturer, Gerstlauer and is the first roller coaster of its type in Canada. The ride officially opened on July 17, 2007.

See also

Mindbender

References

External links

Roller coasters in Alberta
Roller coasters introduced in 2007
Tourist attractions in Edmonton